The 88th Military Command, is a Hellenic Army mechanized infantry brigade responsible for the defence of the island of Lemnos, Greece.

Structure 
  88th Military Command (88 ΣΔΙ), based at Lemnos
 HQ Company (ΛΣΤ/88 ΣΔΙ)
 88th Armored Battalion (88 ΕΜΑ)
 285th Mechanized Infantry Battalion (285 Μ/Κ ΤΠ)
 290th Mechanized Infantry Battalion (290 Μ/Κ ΤΠ)
 224th Infantry Battalion (224 ΤΠ)
 88th Self Propelled Artillery Battalion (88 Α/Κ ΜΒΠ-ΠΕΠ)
 101st Artillery Battalion (101 ΜΠΜΠ)
 88th Anti Aircraft Artillery Battalion (88 ΜΑ/ΑΠ)
 88th Engineer Battalion (88 ΤΜΧ)
 88th Medical Corps Battalion (88 ΤΥΓ)
 88th Signal Company (88 ΛΔΒ)
 88th Anti Τank Company (88 ΛΑΤ)
 88th Support Battalion (88 ΤΥΠ)

Mechanized infantry brigades of Greece
Lemnos